The Freedom of the City of Aberdeen is an honour bestowed by the city of Aberdeen, Scotland.

History
The Freedom of the City of Aberdeen has its origins in the 12th century, through the city's Guild of Burgesses. Certain respected residents would be granted free entry into the Guild, earning them the title of Free Burgess. Members of the Guild would have special trading rights, such as exemption from tolls, but would also be required to own arms and be prepared to use them in defence of the city.

Today, the Freedom of Aberdeen is a purely symbolic honour, which can be bestowed by Aberdeen City Council under the terms of Section 206 of the Local Government (Scotland) Act 1973, Part XI – 'Admission of honorary freemen'. The Act states that:

Section 207 of the same Act – 'Limitation of rights of freemen' – further states that:

Individuals
Since the Reform Act, the Freedom of Aberdeen has been conferred on the following persons:
 10 September 1834: Henry Brougham, former Lord Chancellor
 1834: Walter Montagu Douglas Scott, 5th Duke of Buccleuch
 1834: George Hay, 8th Marquess of Tweeddale
 1836: William Hay, Lord Lieutenant of Aberdeenshire
 1837: Charles Gordon-Lennox, former Postmaster General
 1839: George Watt of Aberdeen
 1840: George Sutherland-Leveson-Gower, 2nd Duke of Sutherland
 1841: Robert Wallace, MP for Greenock
 1841: Major George Thomson of Fairley CB, East India Company
 1844: Samuel McKnight of South Carolina
 1844: Rowland Hill, social reformer
 7 September 1848: Prince Albert, husband of Queen Victoria 
 1849: Robert Peel, former Prime Minister of the United Kingdom
 1853: George Howard, 7th Earl of Carlisle
 1854: Joseph Hume, MP for Montrose Burghs
 1858: Philip Stanhope, 5th Earl Stanhope
 1859: David Ogilvy, 10th Earl of Airlie
 28 September 1859: John Russell, Secretary of State for Foreign Affairs 
 1862: Edward Ellice, MP
 20 September 1866: Edward VII, Prince of Wales 
 1871: William Ewart Gladstone, Prime Minister of the United Kingdom
 1876: William Edward Forster, philanthropist
 15 November 1878: Arthur Hamilton-Gordon, Governor of Fiji 
 1881: Sir John Anderson, Engineer and philanthropist 
 1883: John Hamilton-Gordon, Lord Lieutenant of Aberdeenshire
 1883: R. A. Cross, former Home Secretary
 1884: Archibald Primrose, 5th Earl of Rosebery
 1888: John Campbell, former Governor General of Canada
 1890: William Alexander Hunter, MP for Aberdeen North
 1890: Henry Morton Stanley, explorer
 5 July 1892: Andrew Carnegie, philanthropist 
 10 April 1901: Charles William Mitchell, son of shipbuilder Charles Mitchell
 27 April 1901: George Stephen, 1st Baron Mount Stephen, philanthropist (presented at Aberdeen 27 August 1901)
 9 April 1902: Donald Smith, 1st Baron Strathcona and Mount Royal, philanthropist and Lord Rector of the University of Aberdeen
 29 August 1913: Frederick Roberts, 1st Earl Roberts, military commander
 29 August 1918: William Morris Hughes, 7th Prime Minister of Australia
 11 July 1919: Douglas Haig, military commander
 16 August 1926: Weetman Pearson, 1st Viscount Cowdray
 24 October 1927: Sir Robert Williams, explorer, miner and railroad developer
 26 September 1928: John Jellicoe, 2nd Governor-General of New Zealand
 26 September 1928: Sir Thomas Jaffray of Edgehill
 26 September 1928: Robert Laws, missionary
 7 October 1931: James Murray, former MP for East Aberdeenshire
 7 October 1931: George Adam Smith, Principal of the University of Aberdeen
 20 September 1935: James Meston, 1st Baron Meston
 20 September 1935: George Milne, military commander
 19 June 1937: William Lyon Mackenzie King, 10th Prime Minister of Canada
 19 June 1937: Joseph Aloysius Lyons, 10th Prime Minister of Australia 
 31 July 1941: Peter Fraser, 24th Prime Minister of New Zealand
 1942: Jan Smuts, 4th Prime Minister of South Africa
 27 July 1943: John Gilbert Winant, U.S. Ambassador to the United Kingdom
 27 July 1943: Vi-Kyuin Wellington Koo, former Premier of the Republic of China
 27 April 1946: Winston Churchill, Leader of the Conservative Party 
 16 March 1949: John Boyd Orr, Nobel Prize winner and first director of the Rowett Research Institute
 16 March 1949: Thomas Johnston, former Secretary of State for Scotland
 5 June 1956: Clement Attlee, former Prime Minister of the United Kingdom
 5 June 1956: Alexander Steven Bilsland, 1st Baron Bilsland
 25 May 1959: Queen Elizabeth, The Queen Mother
 21 June 1966: Sir Dugald Baird, medical doctor
 21 June 1966: Lady May Baird, medical doctor and town councillor
 21 June 1966: Thomas Dunlop Galbraith, former Minister of State for Scotland
 9 October 1981: Mary Esslemont, former chair of the British Medical Association
 29 November 1984: Nelson Mandela, anti-apartheid activist, and his wife, Winifred Mandela
 6 December 1993: Mikhail Sergeyevich Gorbachev, former President of the Soviet Union
 18 November 1995: Alex C. Collie, former Lord Provost of Aberdeen
 30 March 1999: Alex Ferguson, football manager
 14 August 2004: John Rowland Mallard, medical physicist and university professor 
 20 April 2008: George Donald MBE, William "Buff" Hardie MBE, and Stephen Robertson MBE, comedy trio better known as Scotland the What?
 25 November 2017: Denis Law CBE, Scottish Football Player.

Military Units
 20 August 1949: The Colonel, Officers and other Ranks of the Gordon Highlanders
 8 June 1992: HMS Scylla, RN
 1 July 2006: Highlanders, 4th Battalion, The Royal Regiment of Scotland

Organisations and Groups
 11 February 1995: University of Aberdeen, in its Quincentenary year
 16 December 2022: The Aberdeen Football Club.

References

History of Aberdeen
Aberdeen
Lists of Scottish people